Al-Habib may refer to:
Yasser Al-Habib, Kuwaiti Shia cleric
Habib Al-Habib, Saudi television actor
Muhammad ibn al-Habib, Moroccan teacher & Islamic author, and 
Jarh Al Habib, the sixth studio album by Lebanese-Emirati singer, Diana Haddad
Radwan al-Habib, Syrian politician
Hassan Al-Habib, Saudi footballer
Hassan Al Habib, rebel militia spokesman, Central African Republic
Muhammad VI al-Habib (d.1929), Husainid dynastic ruler